Lunch is a meal eaten around the middle of the day. It is commonly the second meal of the day, after breakfast, and varies in size by culture and region.

Etymology

According to the Oxford English Dictionary (OED), the etymology of lunch is uncertain. It may have evolved from lump in a similar way to hunch, a derivative of hump, and bunch, a derivative of bump. Alternatively, it may have evolved from the Spanish , meaning . It was first recorded in 1591 with the meaning  as in "lunch of bacon". The modern definition was first recorded in 1829.

Luncheon ( or ) has a similarly uncertain origin according to the OED, which they claim is "related in some way" to lunch. It is possible that luncheon is an extension of lunch in a similarly way with punch to puncheon and trunch to truncheon. Originally interchangeable with lunch, it is now used in specially formal circumstances. The Oxford Companion to Food claims that luncheon is a Northern England English word that is derived from the Old English word  or  meaning .

History
Meals have become ingrained in each society as being natural and logical. What one society eats may seem extraordinary to another. The same is true of what was eaten long ago in history, as food tastes, menu items, and meal periods have changed dramatically over time. During the Middle Ages, the main meal of the day, then called dinner, for almost everyone, took place late in the morning after several hours of work, when there was no need for artificial lighting. In the early to mid-17th century, the meal could be any time between late morning and mid-afternoon.

During the late 17th and 18th centuries, this meal was gradually pushed back into the evening, creating a greater time gap between breakfast and dinner. A meal called lunch came to fill the gap. The late evening meal, called supper, became squeezed out as dinner advanced into the evening, and often became a snack. But formal "supper parties", artificially lit by candles, sometimes with entertainment, persisted as late as the Regency era, and a ball normally included supper, often served very late.

Until the early 19th century,  was generally reserved for the ladies, who would often have lunch with one another when their husbands were out. The meal was often relatively light, and often included left-overs from the previous night's dinner, which were often plentiful. As late as 1945, Emily Post wrote in the magazine Etiquette that luncheon is "generally given by and for women, but it is not unusual, especially in summer places or in town on Saturday or Sunday, to include an equal number of men"hence the mildly disparaging phrase, "the ladies who lunch". Lunch was a ladies' light meal; when the Prince of Wales stopped to eat a dainty luncheon with lady friends, he was laughed at for this effeminacy.

Beginning in the 1840s, afternoon tea supplemented this luncheon at four o'clock. Mrs Beeton's Book of Household Management (1861)a guide to all aspects of running a household in Victorian Britain, edited by Isabella Beetonhad much less to explain about luncheon than about dinners or ball suppers:

Modern
With the growth of industrialisation in the 19th century, male workers began to work long shifts at the factory, severely disrupting the age-old eating habits of rural life. Initially, workers were sent home for a quick dinner provided by their wives, but as the workplace was moved farther from home, working men took to giving themselves something portable to eat during a break in the middle of the day.

The lunch meal slowly became institutionalised in England when workers with long and fixed-hour jobs at the factory were eventually given an hour off work to eat lunch and thus gain strength for the afternoon shift. Stalls and later chop houses near the factories began to provide mass-produced food for the working class, and the meal soon became an established part of the daily routine, remaining so to this day.

In many countries and regions, lunch is the dinner or main meal. Prescribed lunchtimes allow workers to return to their homes to eat with their families. Consequently, businesses close during lunchtime when lunch is the customary main meal of the day. Lunch also becomes dinner on special days, such as holidays or special events, including, for example, Christmas dinner and harvest dinners such as Thanksgiving; on these special days, dinner is usually served in the early afternoon. The main meal on Sunday, whether at a restaurant or home, is called "Sunday dinner", and for Christians is served after morning church services.

Asia 
A traditional Bengali lunch is a seven-course meal. Bengali cuisine is a culinary style originating in Bengal, a region in the eastern part of the Indian subcontinent, which is now divided between Bangladesh and Indian states of West Bengal, Tripura, Assam's Barak Valley. The first course is shukto, which is a mix of vegetables cooked with few spices and topped with a coconut sauce. The second course consists of rice, dal, and a vegetable curry. The third course consists of rice and fish curry. The fourth course is that of rice and meat curry (generally chevon, mutton, chicken or lamb). The fifth course contains sweet preparations like rasgulla, pantua, rajbhog, sandesh, etc. The sixth course consists of payesh or mishti doi (sweet yogurt). The seventh course is that of paan, which acts as a mouth freshener.

In China today, lunch is not nearly as complicated as it was before industrialisation. Rice, noodles and other mixed hot foods are often eaten, either at a restaurant or brought in a container. Western cuisine is not uncommon. It is called 午餐 or 午饭 in most areas.

Australia
In Australia, a light meal eaten in the period between 10:30am and noon is considered Morning Tea; an actual lunch will be consumed between 12 and 2 PM. While usually consisting of fruit or a cereal product, a typical Australian brunch may include other foods as well such as burgers, sandwiches, other light food items, and hot dishes. Sometimes, a meal during the late afternoon is referred to as "afternoon tea", a meal in which food portions are usually significantly smaller than at lunch, sometimes consisting of nothing more than coffee or other beverages.

Europe

Western

Lunch in Denmark, referred to as frokost, is a light meal. Often it includes rye bread with different toppings such as liver pâté, herring, and cheese. Smørrebrød is a Danish lunch delicacy that is often used for business meetings or special events.

In Finland, lunch is a full hot meal, served as one course, sometimes with small salads and desserts. Dishes are diverse, ranging from meat or fish courses to soups that are heavy enough to constitute a meal.

In France, the midday meal is taken between noon and 2:00p.m.

In Italy, lunch is taken around 12:30 in the north and at 2:00 p.m. in the center south; it's a full meal but is lighter than supper.

In Germany, lunch was traditionally the main meal of the day. It is traditionally a substantial hot meal, sometimes with additional courses like soup and dessert. It is usually a savoury dish consisting of protein (e.g., meat), starchy foods (e.g., potatoes), and vegetables or salad. Casseroles and stews are popular as well. There are a few sweet dishes like Germknödel or rice pudding that can serve as a main course, too. Lunch is called Mittagessenliterally, "midday's food".

In the Netherlands, Belgium, and Norway, it is common to eat sandwiches for lunch: slices of bread that people usually carry to work or school and eat in the canteen. The slices of bread are usually filled with sweet or savoury foodstuffs such as chocolate sprinkles (hagelslag), apple syrup, peanut butter, slices of meat, cheese or kroket. The meal typically includes coffee, milk or juice, and sometimes yogurt, some fruit or soup. It is eaten around noon, during a lunch break.

In Portugal, lunch (almoço in Portuguese) consists of a full hot meal, similar to dinner, usually with soup, meat or fish course, and dessert. It is served between noon and 2:00p.m. It is the main meal of the day throughout the country. The Portuguese word lanches derives from the English word "lunch", but it refers to a lighter meal or snack taken during the afternoon (around 5pm) due to the fact that, traditionally, Portuguese dinner is served at a later hour than in English-speaking countries.

In Spain, the midday meal, "lunch" takes place between 1:00 and 3:00p.m. and is effectively dinner, (the main meal of the day); in contrast, supper usually begins between 8:30 and 10:00p.m. Being the main meal of the day everywhere, it usually consists of a three-course meal: the first course usually consists of an appetizer; the main course of a more elaborate dish, usually meat- or fish-based; the dessert of something sweet, often accompanied by a coffee or small amounts of spirits. Most places of work have a complete restaurant with a lunch break of a least an hour. Spanish schools also have a full restaurant, and students have a one-hour break. Three courses are standard practice at home, workplace, and schools. Most small shops close for between two and four hoursusually between 1:30 to 4:30p.m.to allow to go home for a full lunch.

In Sweden, lunch is usually a full hot meal, much as in Finland.

In the United Kingdom, except on Sundays, lunch is often a small meal designed to stave off hunger until returning home from work and eating dinner. It is usually eaten early in the afternoon. Lunch is often purveyed and consumed in pubs. Pub lunch dishes include fish and chips, ploughman's lunch and others. But on Sundays, it is usually the main meal, and typically the largest and most formal meal of the week, to which family or other guests may be invited. It traditionally centres on a Sunday roast joint of meat. It may be served rather later than a weekday lunch, or not.

Central
In Hungary, lunch is traditionally the main meal of the day, following a leves (soup).

In Poland, the main meal of the day (called obiad) is traditionally eaten between 1:00pm and 5:00pm, and consists of a soup and a main dish. Most Poles equate the English word "lunch" with "obiad" because it is the second of the three main meals of the day; śniadanie (breakfast), obiad (lunch/dinner) and kolacja (dinner/supper). There is another meal eaten by some called drugie śniadanie, which means "second breakfast". Drugie śniadanie is eaten around 10:00am and is a light snack, usually consisting of sandwiches, salad, or a thin soup.

In Romania, lunch (prânz in Romanian) is the main hot meal of the day. Lunch normally consists of two dishes: usually, the first course is a soup and the second course, the main course, often consists of meat accompanied by potato, rice or pasta (garnitură) Traditionally, people used to bake and eat desserts, but nowadays it is less common. On Sundays, the lunch is more consistent and is usually accompanied by an appetiser or salad.

Eastern
In Russia, the midday meal is taken in the afternoon. Usually, lunch is the biggest meal and consists of a first course, usually a soup, and a second course which would be meat and a garnish. Tea is standard.

In Bosnia and Herzegovina, lunch is the day's main meal. It is traditionally a substantial hot meal, sometimes with additional courses like soup and dessert. It is usually a savoury dish, consisting of protein (such as meat), starchy foods (such as potatoes), and a vegetable or salad. It is usually eaten around 2:00pm.

In Bulgaria lunch is usually eaten between 12:00 PM - 14:00 PM. In the capital of Sofia, people usually order takeaway because lunch breaks are too short to go in place. In other areas, Bulgarians often have salad as first meal and a dish from the national cuisine as second one.

Middle East 

In West Asia (Middle East) and in most Arab countries, lunch is eaten between 1:00pm and 4:00pm and is the main meal of the day. It usually consists of meat, rice, vegetables and sauces and is sometimes but not always followed by dessert. Lunch is also eaten as a light meal at times in the Middle East, such as when children arrive at home from school while the parents are still out working. Water is commonly served, which may be iced, and other beverages such as soft drinks or yogurt drinks are also consumed.

North America
In the United States and Canada, lunch is usually a moderately sized meal generally eaten between 11 and 1. During the work week, North Americans generally eat a quick lunch that often includes some type of sandwich, soup, or leftovers from the previous night's dinner (e.g., rice or pasta). Children often bring packed lunches to school, which might consist of a sandwich such as bologna (or other cold cut) and cheese, tuna, chicken, or peanut butter and jelly, as well as in Canada, savoury pie, as well as some fruit, chips, dessert and a drink such as juice, milk, or water. They may also buy meals as provided by their school. Adults may leave work to go out for a quick lunch, which might include some type of hot or cold sandwich such as a hamburger or "sub" sandwich. Salads and soups are also common, as well as a soup and sandwich, tacos, burritos, sushi, bento boxes, and pizza. Lunch may be consumed at various types of restaurants, such as formal, fast casual and fast food restaurants. Canadians and Americans generally do not go home for lunch, and lunch rarely lasts more than an hour except for business lunches, which may last longer. In the United States the three-martini lunchso called because the meal extends to the amount of time it takes to drink three martinishas been making a comeback since 2010. In the United States, businesses can deduct 80% of the cost of these lunches. Children generally are given a break in the middle of the school day to eat lunch. Public schools often have a cafeteria where children can buy lunch or eat a packed lunch. Boarding schools and private schools, including universities, often have a cafeteria where lunch is served.

In Mexico, lunch (almuerzo) is usually the main meal of the day and normally takes place between 2:00pm and 4:00pm. It usually includes three or four courses: the first is an entrée of rice, noodles or pasta, but also may include a soup or salad. The second consists of a main dish, called a guisado, served with one or two side dishes such as refried beans, cooked vegetables, rice or salad. The main dish is accompanied by tortillas or a bread called bolillo. The third course is a combination of a traditional dessert or sweet, café de olla, and a digestif. During the meal, it is usual to drink aguas frescas, although soft drinks have gained ground in recent years.

South America
In Argentina, lunch is usually the main meal of the day, and normally takes place between noon and 2:00 p.m. People usually eat a wide variety of foods, such as chicken, beef, pasta, salads, and a drink like water, soda or wine, and some dessert. Although at work, people usually take a fast meal which can consist of a sandwich brought from home or bought as fast food.

In Brazil, lunch is the main meal of the day, taking place between 11:30 a.m. and 2:00 p.m. Brazilians basically eat rice with beans, salad, french fries, some kind of meat or pasta dishes, with juice or soft drinks. But the kind of food may vary from region to region. A fast and more simple meal (sandwich, etc.) are common during weekdays. After meal, some kind of dessert or coffee are also common.

Workdays
Since lunch typically falls in the early-middle of the working day, it can either be eaten on a break from work, or as part of the workday. The difference between those who work through lunch and those who take it off could be a matter of cultural, social class, bargaining power, or the nature of the work. Also, to simplify matters, some cultures refer to meal breaks at work as "lunch" no matter when they occureven in the middle of the night. This is especially true for jobs that have employees that rotate shifts.

Gallery

See also

 Break (work)
 Free lunch
 Lunch box
 Lunch counter
 Lunch lady
 Lunch meat
 Mahlzeit (German salutation)
 National School Lunch Act
 Plate lunch
 There ain't no such thing as a free lunch

Notes

References

External links

 
 Cookbook – Wikibooks